Louisville City FC U-23 is an American pre-professional soccer club based in Louisville, Kentucky that plays in the Great Lakes Division of USL League Two. They are the reserve club of USL Championship club Louisville City FC.

History
The club was founded to begin play in the 2020 USL League Two season. They would belong to the Great Lakes Division. They were scheduled to play their first match on May 19 against the Flint City Bucks, however, the 2020 season was cancelled due to the COVID-19 pandemic.

References

 
USL League Two teams
Soccer clubs in Kentucky